This is an incomplete list of Statutory Rules of Northern Ireland in 2008.

1-100

 Moneymore Road, Cookstown (Abandonment) Order (Northern Ireland) 2008 (S.R. 2008 No. 1)
 Energy Order 2003 (Supply of Information) Regulations (Northern Ireland) 2008 (S.R. 2008 No. 3)
 Roshure Road, Desertmartin (Abandonment) Order (Northern Ireland) 2008 (S.R. 2008 No. 12)
 Airports (Designation) (Power to Detain and Sell Aircraft) Order (Northern Ireland) 2008 (S.R. 2008 No. 13)
 M2/A26 (Ballee Road East link) Order (Northern Ireland) 2008 (S.R. 2008 No. 14)
 New NAV List (Time of Valuation) Order (Northern Ireland) 2008 (S.R. 2008 No. 15)
 Jobseeker’s Allowance (Joint Claims) (Amendment) Regulations (Northern Ireland) 2008 (S.R. 2008 No. 16)
 Planning (Environmental Impact Assessment) (Amendment) Regulations (Northern Ireland) 2008 (S.R. 2008 No. 17)
 Waste Management (Miscellaneous Provisions) Regulations (Northern Ireland) 2008 (S.R. 2008 No. 18)
 Disability Discrimination (Private Hire Vehicles) (Carrying of Guide Dogs etc.) Regulations (Northern Ireland) 2008 (S.R. 2008 No. 19)
 Deposits in the Sea (Exemptions) (Amendment) Order (Northern Ireland) 2008 (S.R. 2008 No. 20)
 Health and Safety (Fees) Regulations (Northern Ireland) 2008 (S.R. 2008 No. 21)
 Rules of the Supreme Court (Northern Ireland) (Amendment) 2008 (S.R. 2008 No. 22)
 Criminal Appeal (Offenders Assisting Investigations and Prosecutions) Rules (Northern Ireland) 2008 (S.R. 2008 No. 23)
 Family Proceedings (Amendment) Rules (Northern Ireland) 2008 (S.R. 2008 No. 24)
 Pig Production Development (Levy) Revocation Order (Northern Ireland) 2008 (S.R. 2008 No. 25)
 Salaries (Assembly Ombudsman and Commissioner for Complaints) Order (Northern Ireland) 2008 (S.R. 2008 No. 26)
 Eastermeade Gardens, Ballymoney (Abandonment) Order (Northern Ireland) 2008 (S.R. 2008 No. 27)
 Motor Vehicles (Wearing of Seat Belts) (Amendment) Regulations (Northern Ireland) 2008 (S.R. 2008 No. 29)
 Coroners (Practice and Procedure) (Amendment) Rules (Northern Ireland) 2008 (S.R. 2008 No. 32)
 Foyle Area and Carlingford Area (Angling) (Amendment) Regulations 2008 (S.R. 2008 No. 33)
 Less Favoured Area Compensatory Allowances Regulations (Northern Ireland) 2008 (S.R. 2008 No. 34)
 Magistrates’ Courts (Children (Northern Ireland) Order 1995) (Amendment) Rules (Northern Ireland) 2008 (S.R. 2008 No. 35)
 Trunk Road T15 (Carland Bridge Realignment) Order (Northern Ireland) 2008 (S.R. 2008 No. 36)
 Zootechnical Standards (Amendment) Regulations (Northern Ireland) 2008 (S.R. 2008 No. 37)
 Bluetongue Order (Northern Ireland) 2008 (S.R. 2008 No. 38)
 Travelling Expenses and Remission of Charges (Amendment) Regulations (Northern Ireland) 2008 (S.R. 2008 No. 39)
 Street Works (Inspection Fees) (Amendment) Regulations (Northern Ireland) 2008 (S.R. 2008 No. 40)
 Miscellaneous Food Additives (Amendment) Regulations (Northern Ireland) 2008 (S.R. 2008 No. 41)
 Condensed Milk and Dried Milk (Amendment) Regulations (Northern Ireland) 2008 (S.R. 2008 No. 42)
 Eastburn Avenue, Ballymoney (Abandonment) Order (Northern Ireland) 2008 (S.R. 2008 No. 44)
 Social Security (Industrial Injuries) (Prescribed Diseases) (Amendment) Regulations (Northern Ireland) 2008 (S.R. 2008 No. 45)
 Departments (Transfer of Functions) Order (Northern Ireland) 2008 (S.R. 2008 No. 46)
 Employment Rights (Increase of Limits) Order (Northern Ireland) 2008 (S.R. 2008 No. 47)
 Rates (Regional Rates) Order (Northern Ireland) 2008 (S.R. 2008 No. 48)
 Rates (Industrial Hereditaments) (Amendment) Order (Northern Ireland) 2008 (S.R. 2008 No. 49)
 Teachers’ Pensions (Miscellaneous Amendments) Regulations (Northern Ireland) 2008 (S.R. 2008 No. 50)
 Social Security (National Insurance Numbers) (Amendment) Regulations (Northern Ireland) 2008 (S.R. 2008 No. 51)
 Measuring Instruments (Use for Trade) (Amendment) Regulations (Northern Ireland) 2008 (S.R. 2008 No. 52)
 Animals and Animal Products (Import and Export) (Amendment) Regulations (Northern Ireland) 2008 (S.R. 2008 No. 53)
 Electricity (Offshore Wind and Water Driven Generating Stations) (Permitted Capacity) Order (Northern Ireland) 2008 (S.R. 2008 No. 54)
 Offshore Electricity Development (Environmental Impact Assessment) Regulations (Northern Ireland) 2008 (S.R. 2008 No. 55)
 Police Service of Northern Ireland (Conduct) (Amendment) Regulations 2008 (S.R. 2008 No. 56)
 Bluetongue (Amendment) Order (Northern Ireland) 2008 (S.R. 2008 No. 59)
 Plant Health (Import Inspection Fees) (Amendment) Regulations (Northern Ireland) 2008 (S.R. 2008 No. 60)
 Traffic Signs (Amendment) Regulations (Northern Ireland) 2008 (S.R. 2008 No. 63)
 Pensions (2008 Act) (Commencement No. 1) Order (Northern Ireland) 2008 (S.R. 2008 No. 65)
 Domestic Energy Efficiency Grants (Amendment) Regulations (Northern Ireland) 2008 (S.R. 2008 No. 67)
 Rate Relief (Qualifying Age) (Amendment) Regulations (Northern Ireland) 2008 (S.R. 2008 No. 68)
 Social Security (Claims and Payments) (Amendment) Regulations (Northern Ireland) 2008 (S.R. 2008 No. 69)
 Dairy Produce Quotas (Amendment) Regulations (Northern Ireland) 2008 (S.R. 2008 No. 70)
 Kirk Road, Ballymoney (Abandonment) Order (Northern Ireland) 2008 (S.R. 2008 No. 72)
 Pneumoconiosis, etc., (Workers’ Compensation) (Payment of Claims) (Amendment) Regulations (Northern Ireland) 2008 (S.R. 2008 No. 73)
 Waste (Amendment) (2007 Order) (Commencement No.2) Order (Northern Ireland) 2008 (S.R. 2008 No. 75)
 Conduct of Employment Agencies and Employment Businesses (Amendment) Regulations (Northern Ireland) 2008 (S.R. 2008 No. 76)
 Producer Responsibility Obligations (Packaging Waste) (Amendment) Regulations (Northern Ireland) 2008 (S.R. 2008 No. 77)
 Penalty Charges (Additional Contravention) Regulations (Northern Ireland) 2008 (S.R. 2008 No. 78)
 Special Educational Needs and Disability (General Qualifications Bodies) (Relevant Qualifications, Reasonable Steps and Physical Features) Regulations (Northern Ireland) 2008 (S.R. 2008 No. 79)
 Disability Discrimination (Private Clubs, etc.) Regulations (Northern Ireland) 2008 (S.R. 2008 No. 81)
 Meat Products (Amendment) Regulations (Northern Ireland) 2008 (S.R. 2008 No. 82)
 Pig Production Development (Levy) Revocation (No. 2) Order (Northern Ireland) 2008 (S.R. 2008 No. 83)
 Guaranteed Minimum Pensions Increase Order (Northern Ireland) 2008 (S.R. 2008 No. 84)
 Plant Protection Products (Amendment) Regulations (Northern Ireland) 2008 (S.R. 2008 No. 85)
 Social Security Pensions (Home Responsibilities) (Amendment) Regulations (Northern Ireland) 2008 (S.R. 2008 No. 88)
 Meat (Official Controls Charges) Regulations (Northern Ireland) 2008 (S.R. 2008 No. 89)
 Recovery of Health Services Charges (Amounts) (Amendment) Regulations (Northern Ireland) 2008 (S.R. 2008 No. 90)
 Health and Personal Social Services (Assessment of Resources) (Amendment) Regulations (Northern Ireland) 2008 (S.R. 2008 No. 91)
 Social Security Benefits Up-rating Order (Northern Ireland) 2008 (S.R. 2008 No. 92)
 Welfare Reform (2007 Act) (Commencement No. 3) Order (Northern Ireland) 2008 (S.R. 2008 No. 93)
 Insolvency (Disqualification from Office: General) Order (Northern Ireland) 2008 (S.R. 2008 No. 94)
 Certification Officer (Fees) Regulations (Northern Ireland) 2008 (S.R. 2008 No. 95)
 Health and Personal Social Services (Superannuation Scheme and Compensation for Premature Retirement) (Amendment) Regulations (Northern Ireland) 2008 (S.R. 2008 No. 96)
 Occupational and Personal Pension Schemes (General Levy) (Amendment) Regulations (Northern Ireland) 2008 (S.R. 2008 No. 97)
 Eggs and Chicks Regulations (Northern Ireland) 2008c S.R. 2008 No. 98)
 Rice Products from the United States of America (Restriction on First Placing on the Market) Regulations (Northern Ireland) 2008 (S.R. 2008 No. 99)
 Housing Benefit (Executive Determinations) Regulations (Northern Ireland) 2008 (S.R. 2008 No. 100)

101-200

 Housing Benefit (Local Housing Allowance) (Amendment) Regulations ( Northern Ireland) 2008 101)
 Housing Benefit (State Pension Credit) (Local Housing Allowance) (Amendment) Regulations (Northern Ireland) 2008 (S.R. 2008 No. 102)
 Housing Benefit (Local Housing Allowance) (Miscellaneous and Consequential Amendments) Regulations (Northern Ireland) 2008 (S.R. 2008 No. 103)
 Pensions (2005 Order) (Commencement No. 11) Order (Northern Ireland) 2008 (S.R. 2008 No. 104)
 Social Security Benefits Up-rating Regulations (Northern Ireland) 2008 (S.R. 2008 No. 105)
 Legal Advice and Assistance (Amendment) Regulations (Northern Ireland) 2008 (S.R. 2008 No. 106)
 Legal Advice and Assistance (Financial Conditions) Regulations (Northern Ireland) 2008 (S.R. 2008 No. 107)
 Legal Aid (Financial Conditions) Regulations (Northern Ireland) 2008 (S.R. 2008 No. S.R. 2008 No. 108)
 Motor Vehicle Testing (Amendment) Regulations (Northern Ireland) 2008 (S.R. 2008 No. S.R. 2008 No. 109)
 Discretionary Financial Assistance (Amendment) Regulations ( Northern Ireland) 2008 (S.R. 2008 No. 111)
 Social Security (Miscellaneous Amendments) Regulations ( Northern Ireland) 2008 (S.R. 2008 No. 112)
 Social Security (Industrial Injuries) (Dependency) (Permitted Earnings Limit) Order ( Northern Ireland) 2008 (S.R. 2008 No. 113)
 Seeds (Miscellaneous Amendments) Regulations (Northern Ireland) 2008 (S.R. 2008 No. 114)
 Workmen’s Compensation (Supplementation) (Amendment) Regulations (Northern Ireland) 2008 (S.R. 2008 No. 115)
 Occupational Pension Schemes (Internal Dispute Resolution Procedures) (Consequential and Miscellaneous Amendments) Regulations (Northern Ireland) 2008 (S.R. 2008 No. 116)
 Occupational Pension Schemes (Non-European Schemes Exemption) Regulations (Northern Ireland) 2008 (S.R. 2008 No. 117)
 Insolvency (Amendment) Rules (Northern Ireland) 2008 (S.R. 2008 No. 118)
 Child Support (Miscellaneous Amendments) Regulations (Northern Ireland) 2008 (S.R. 2008 No. 119)
 Social Security Pensions (Low Earnings Threshold) Order (Northern Ireland) 2008 (S.R. 2008 No. 120)
 Social Security Revaluation of Earnings Factors Order (Northern Ireland) 2008 (S.R. 2008 No. 121)
 Pensions Increase (Review) Order (Northern Ireland) 2008 (S.R. 2008 No. 123)
 Rate Relief (Lone Pensioner Allowance) Regulations (Northern Ireland) 2008 (S.R. 2008 No. 124)
 Potatoes Originating in Egypt (Amendment) Regulations (Northern Ireland) 2008 (S.R. 2008 No. 125)
 Honey (Amendment) Regulations (Northern Ireland) 2008 (S.R. 2008 No. 126)
 Safeguarding Vulnerable Groups (2007 Order) (Commencement No. 1) Order (Northern Ireland) 2008 (S.R. 2008 No. 127)
 Optical Charges and Payments (Amendment) Regulations (Northern Ireland) 2008 (S.R. 2008 No. 128)
 Education (Student Loans) (Repayment) (Amendment) Regulations (Northern Ireland) 2008 (S.R. 2008 No. 129)
 Health and Personal Social Services (Superannuation Scheme, Injury Benefits, Additional Voluntary Contributions and Compensation for Premature Retirement) (Amendment) Regulations (Northern Ireland) 2008 (S.R. 2008 No. 130)
 Healthy Start Scheme and Day Care Food Scheme (Amendment) Regulations (Northern Ireland) 2008 (S.R. 2008 No. 131)
 Occupational Pension Schemes (Employer Debt and Miscellaneous Amendments) Regulations (Northern Ireland) 2008 (S.R. 2008 No. 132)
 Companies (Late Filing Penalties) Regulations (Northern Ireland) 2008 (S.R. 2008 No. 133)
 Limited Liability Partnerships (Filing Periods and Late Filing Penalties) Regulations (Northern Ireland) 2008 (S.R. 2008 No. 134)
 Motorways Traffic Regulations (Northern Ireland) 2008 (S.R. 2008 No. 135)
 Ballyboley Road, Larne (Abandonment) Order ( Northern Ireland) 2008 (S.R. 2008 No. 136)
 Waste and Contaminated Land (1997 Order) (Commencement No. 8) Order (Northern Ireland) 2008 (S.R. 2008 No. 138)
 Health and Personal Social Services (Joint Committee for Commissioning) (Amendment) Order (Northern Ireland) 2008 (S.R. 2008 No. 139)
 Disability Discrimination (Guidance on the Definition of Disability) (Revocation) Order (Northern Ireland) 2008 (S.R. 2008 No. 140)
 Disability Discrimination (Guidance on the Definition of Disability) (Appointed Day) Order (Northern Ireland) 2008 (S.R. 2008 No. 141)
 Health and Social Services Trusts (Originating Capital) Order (Northern Ireland) 2008 (S.R. 2008 No. 142)
 Donaghadee (Harbour Area) Order (Northern Ireland) 2008 (S.R. 2008 No. 143)
 Occupational Pension Schemes (Levy Ceiling) Order (Northern Ireland) 2008 (S.R. 2008 No. 144)
 Occupational Pension Schemes (Levies) (Amendment) Regulations (Northern Ireland) 2008 (S.R. 2008 No. 145)
 Pension Protection Fund (Pension Compensation Cap) Order (Northern Ireland) 2008 (S.R. 2008 No. 146)
 Welfare Reform (2007 Act) (Commencement No. 4 and Consequential Provisions) Order (Northern Ireland) 2008 (S.R. 2008 No. 147)
 B2 Silverwood Road, Lurgan (Abandonment) Order (Northern Ireland) 2008 (S.R. 2008 No. 149)
 Valuation Tribunal (Amendment) Rules (Northern Ireland) 2008 (S.R. 2008 No. 153)
 District Judge (Magistrates’ Courts) Order (Northern Ireland) 2008 (S.R. 2008 No. 154)
 Court Funds (Amendment) Rules (Northern Ireland) 2008 (S.R. 2008 No. 156)
 Sex Discrimination Order 1976 (Amendment) Regulations (Northern Ireland) 2008 (S.R. 2008 No. 159)
 Waste Management Licences (Consultation and Compensation) Regulations (Northern Ireland) 2008 (S.R. 2008 No. 160)
 Companies (Tables A to F) (Amendment) Regulations (Northern Ireland) 2008 (S.R. 2008 No. 161)
 Health and Personal Social Services (Superannuation) (Amendment) Regulations (Northern Ireland) 2008 (S.R. 2008 No. 163)
 Plastic Materials and Articles in Contact with Food Regulations (Northern Ireland) 2008 (S.R. 2008 No. 167)
 Social Security (Work-focused Interviews for Partners) (Amendment) Regulations (Northern Ireland) 2008 (S.R. 2008 No. 169)
 Energy Performance of Buildings (Certificates and Inspections) Regulations (Northern Ireland) 2008 (S.R. 2008 No. 170)
 Specified Products from China (Restriction on First Placing on the Market) Regulations (Northern Ireland) 2008 (S.R. 2008 No. 171)
 Organic Farming Regulations (Northern Ireland) 2008 (S.R. 2008 No. 172)
 Antiville and Ballymena Road, Larne (Abandonment) Order (Northern Ireland) 2008 (S.R. 2008 No. 173)
 Countryside Management Regulations (Northern Ireland) 2008 (S.R. 2008 No. 174)
 Special Educational Needs and Disability (2005 Order) (Amendment) (General Qualifications Bodies) (Alteration of Premises and Enforcement) Regulations (Northern Ireland) 2008 (S.R. 2008 No. 177)
 Occupational Pension Schemes (Employer Debt: Apportionment Arrangements) (Amendment) Regulations (Northern Ireland) 2008 (S.R. 2008 No. 178)
 Social Security (Miscellaneous Amendments No. 2) Regulations (Northern Ireland) 2008 (S.R. 2008 No. 179)
 Fish Health (Amendment) Regulations (Northern Ireland) 2008 (S.R. 2008 No. 183)
 Seed Potatoes (Crop Fees) (Amendment) Regulations (Northern Ireland) 2008 (S.R. 2008 No. 184)
 Unlicensed Fishing for Crabs and Lobster Regulations (Northern Ireland) 2008 (S.R. 2008 No. 185)
 Financial Assistance for Young Farmers Scheme (Amendment) Order (Northern Ireland) 2008 (S.R. 2008 No. 186)
 Transmissible Spongiform Encephalopathies (Amendment) Regulations (Northern Ireland) 2008 (S.R. 2008 No. 188)
 Olive Oil (Marketing Standards) Regulations (Northern Ireland) 2008 (S.R. 2008 No. 189)
 Whole of Government Accounts (Designation of Bodies) Order (Northern Ireland) 2008 (S.R. 2008 No. 191)
 European Qualifications (Pharmacy) Regulations (Northern Ireland) 2008 (S.R. 2008 No. 192)
 Registration of Pharmaceutical Chemists (Exempt Persons) Regulations (Northern Ireland) 2008 (S.R. 2008 No. 193)
 Common Agricultural Policy Single Payment and Support Schemes (Amendment) Regulations (Northern Ireland) 2008 (S.R. 2008 No. 194)
 Pesticides (Maximum Residue Levels in Crops, Food and Feeding Stuffs) (Amendment) Regulations (Northern Ireland) 2008 (S.R. 2008 No. 195)
 Nitrates Action Programme (Amendment) Regulations (Northern Ireland) 2008 (S.R. 2008 No. 196)
 Avian Influenza (Miscellaneous Amendments) Regulations (Northern Ireland) 2008 (S.R. 2008 No. 197)
 Food Labelling (Declaration of Allergens) Regulations (Northern Ireland) 2008 (S.R. 2008 No. 198)
 County Court (Amendment) Rules (Northern Ireland) 2008 (S.R. 2008 No. 199)
 Safeguarding Vulnerable Groups (Transitional Provisions) Order (Northern Ireland) 2008 (S.R. 2008 No. 200)

201-300

 Safeguarding Vulnerable Groups (Prescribed Criteria) (Transitional Provisions) Regulations (Northern Ireland) 2008 (S.R. 2008 No. 201)
 Safeguarding Vulnerable Groups (Barred List Prescribed Information) Regulations (Northern Ireland) 2008 (S.R. 2008 No. 202)
 Safeguarding Vulnerable Groups (Barring Procedure) Regulations (Northern Ireland) 2008 (S.R. 2008 No. 203)
 Plant Health (Amendment) Order (Northern Ireland) 2008 (S.R. 2008 No. 205)
 Criminal Justice (Northern Ireland) Order 2008 (Commencement No.1 and Savings and Transitory Provisions) Order 2008 (S.R. 2008 No. 217)
 General Register Office (Fees) Order (Northern Ireland) 2008 (S.R. 2008 No. 219)
 Pharmaceutical Society of Northern Ireland (General) (Amendment) Regulations (Northern Ireland) 2008 (S.R. 2008 No. 222)
 Road Traffic (2007 Order) (Commencement No. 3 and Amendment) Order (Northern Ireland) 2008 (S.R. 2008 No. 223)
 Magistrates’ Courts (Children (Northern Ireland) Order 1995) (Amendment No. 2) Rules (Northern Ireland) 2008 (S.R. 2008 No. 225)
 Valuation (Water Undertaking) Regulations (Northern Ireland) 2008 (S.R. 2008 No. 226)
 Taxis (Antrim) Bye-Laws (Northern Ireland) 2008 (S.R. 2008 No. 230)
 Quality of Bathing Water Regulations (Northern Ireland) 2008 (S.R. 2008 No. 231)
 Foyle and Carlingford Fisheries (2007 Order) (Commencement No. 1) Order (Northern Ireland) 2008 2S.R. 2008 No. 32)
 Safeguarding Vulnerable Groups (2007 Order) (Commencement No. 2) Order (Northern Ireland) 2008 (S.R. 2008 No. 233)
 Disclosure of Vehicle Insurance Information Regulations (Northern Ireland) 2008 (S.R. 2008 No. 234)
 Planning (Avian Influenza) (Special Development) Order (Northern Ireland) 2008 (S.R. 2008 No. 235)
 Disability Discrimination Act 1995 (Commencement No. 10) Order (Northern Ireland) 2008 (S.R. 2008 No. 236)
 Drinking Milk Regulations (Northern Ireland) 2008 (S.R. 2008 No. 237)
 Firefighters’ Compensation Scheme (Amendment) Order (Northern Ireland) 2008 (S.R. 2008 No. 238)
 Spreadable Fats (Marketing Standards) and the Milk and Milk Products (Protection of Designations) Regulations (Northern Ireland) 2008 (S.R. 2008 No. 239)
 Reporting of Prices of Milk Products Regulations (Northern Ireland) 2008 (S.R. 2008 No. 240)
 Energy Performance of Buildings (Certificates and Inspections) (Amendment) Regulations (Northern Ireland) 2008 (S.R. 2008 No. 241)
 Police Powers for Designated Staff (Complaints and Misconduct) Regulations (Northern Ireland) 2008 (S.R. 2008 No. 242)
 Road Traffic (2007 Order) (Commencement No. 4 and Amendment) Order (Northern Ireland) 2008 (S.R. 2008 No. 244)
 Police Powers for Designated Staff (Code of Ethics) Order (Northern Ireland) 2008 (S.R. 2008 No. 243)
 Motor Hackney Carriages (Belfast) (Amendment) By-Laws (Northern Ireland) 2008 (S.R. 2008 No. 245)
 Legal Aid in Criminal Proceedings (Costs) (Amendment) Rules (Northern Ireland) 2008 (S.R. 2008 No. 248)
 Care Tribunal (Amendment) Regulations (Northern Ireland) 2008 (S.R. 2008 No. 249)
 Education (Student Support) Regulations (Northern Ireland) 2008 (S.R. 2008 No. 250)
 Magistrates’ Courts (Amendment) Rules (Northern Ireland) 2008 (S.R. 2008 No. 251)
 Magistrates’ Courts (Criminal Justice (Children)) (Amendment) Rules (Northern Ireland) 2008 (S.R. 2008 No. 252)
 Magistrates’ Courts (Anti-social Behaviour Orders) (Amendment) Rules (Northern Ireland) 2008 (S.R. 2008 No. 253)
 Students Awards (Amendment) Regulations (Northern Ireland) 2008 (S.R. 2008 No. 254)
 Education (Student Loans) (Amendment) Regulations (Northern Ireland) 2008 (S.R. 2008 No. 255)
 Health and Social Care (Pension Scheme) Regulations (Northern Ireland) 2008 (S.R. 2008 No. 256)
 Taxis (Enniskillen) (Revocation) Bye-Laws (Northern Ireland) 2008 (S.R. 2008 No. 257)
 Social Security (Industrial Injuries) (Prescribed Diseases) (Amendment No. 2) Regulations (Northern Ireland) 2008 (S.R. 2008 No. 258)
 Family Proceedings (Amendment No. 2) Rules (Northern Ireland) 2008 (S.R. 2008 No. 259)
 Feeding Stuffs (Amendment) Regulations (Northern Ireland) 2008 (S.R. 2008 No. 260)
 Insolvency (Voluntary Winding Up) (Forms) Regulations (Northern Ireland) 2008 (S.R. 2008 No. 261)
 Social Security (Students and Miscellaneous Amendments) Regulations (Northern Ireland) 2008 (S.R. 2008 No. 262)
 Control of Salmonella in Poultry Scheme Order (Northern Ireland) 2008 (S.R. 2008 No. 263)
 Companies (Public Sector Audit) Order (Northern Ireland) 2008 (S.R. 2008 No. 264)
 Plastic Materials and Articles in Contact with Food (Amendment) Regulations (Northern Ireland) 2008 (S.R. 2008 No. 271)
 Diseases of Animals (Approval of Disinfectants) Order (Northern Ireland) 2008 (S.R. 2008 No. 272)
 Bluetongue Regulations (Northern Ireland) 2008 (S.R. 2008 No. 275)
 Welfare Reform (2007 Act) (Commencement No. 5) Order (Northern Ireland) 2008 (S.R. 2008 No. 276)
 Welfare of Animals (Slaughter or Killing) (Amendment) Regulations (Northern Ireland) 2008 (S.R. 2008 No. 277)
 Environmental Impact Assessment (Agriculture) (Amendment) Regulations (Northern Ireland) 2008 (S.R. 2008 No. 278)
 Employment and Support Allowance Regulations (Northern Ireland) 2008 (S.R. 2008 No. 280)
 Penalty Fares (Increase) Order (Northern Ireland) 2008 (S.R. 2008 No. 281)
 Smoke Control Areas (Exempted Fireplaces) (Amendment) Regulations (Northern Ireland) 2008 (S.R. 2008 No. 282)
 Employment and Support Allowance (Transitional Provisions) Regulations (Northern Ireland) 2008 (S.R. 2008 No. 283)
 Housing Benefit (Extended Payments) (Amendment) Regulations (Northern Ireland) 2008 (S.R. 2008 No. 285)
 Employment and Support Allowance (Consequential Provisions) Regulations (Northern Ireland) 2008 (S.R. 2008 No. 286)
 Guarantees of Origin of Electricity Produced from High-efficiency Cogeneration Regulations (Northern Ireland) 2008 (S.R. 2008 No. 287)
 Social Fund Winter Fuel Payment (Temporary Increase) Regulations (Northern Ireland) 2008 (S.R. 2008 No. 289)
 Social Security (Students Responsible for Children or Young Persons) (Amendment) Regulations (Northern Ireland) 2008 (S.R. 2008 No. 290)
 Child Maintenance (2008 Act) (Commencement No. 1) Order (Northern Ireland) 2008 (S.R. 2008 No. 291)
 Travelling Expenses and Remission of Charges (Amendment No. 2) Regulations (Northern Ireland) 2008 (S.R. 2008 No. 292)
 Criminal Justice (Northern Ireland) Order 2008 (Commencement No. 2) Order 2008 (S.R. 2008 No. 293)
 Industrial Training Levy (Construction Industry) Order (Northern Ireland) 2008 (S.R. 2008 No. 294)
 Farm Modernisation Programme Regulations (Northern Ireland) 2008 (S.R. 2008 No. 295)
 Supply Chain Development Programme Grant Regulations (Northern Ireland) 2008 (S.R. 2008 No. 296)
 Vocational Training and Information Actions Grant Regulations (Northern Ireland) 2008 (S.R. 2008 No. 297)
 Foyle Area (Control of Oyster Fishing) Regulations 2008 (S.R. 2008 No. 298)
 Foyle Area (Landing Areas for Oysters) Regulations 2008 (S.R. 2008 No. 299)
 Foyle Area (Licensing of Oyster Fishing) Regulations 2008 (S.R. 2008 No. 300)

301-400

 Foyle Area (Oyster Logbook and Identification Tagging) Regulations 2008 (S.R. 2008 No. 301)
 Foyle Area and Carlingford Area (Prohibition of Sale of Salmon and Sea Trout Caught by Rod and Line) Regulations 2008 (S.R. 2008 No. 302)
 Pension Protection Fund (Entry Rules) (Amendment) Regulations (Northern Ireland) 2008 (S.R. 2008 No. 303)
 Inshore Fishing (Prohibition of Fishing and Fishing Methods) (Amendment) Regulations (Northern Ireland) 2008 (S.R. 2008 No. 304)
 Pensions (2005 Order) (Code of Practice) (Dispute Resolution) (Appointed Day) Order (Northern Ireland) 2008 (S.R. 2008 No. 305)
 Children and Young Persons (Sale of Tobacco etc.) Regulations (Northern Ireland) 2008 (S.R. 2008 No. 306)
 Smoke-free (Exemptions, Vehicles, Penalties and Discounted Amounts) (Amendment) Regulations (Northern Ireland) 2008 (S.R. 2008 No. 307)
 Local Government (Constituting a Joint Committee a Body Corporate) Order (Northern Ireland) 2008 (S.R. 2008 No. 310)
 Police Trainee (Amendment) Regulations (Northern Ireland) 2008 (S.R. 2008 No. 314)
 Cross-border Railway Services (Working Time) Regulations (Northern Ireland) 2008 (S.R. 2008 No. 315)
 Fisheries (Amendment) Byelaws (Northern Ireland) 2008 (S.R. 2008 No. 318)
 Fisheries (Conservation of Coarse Fish) Byelaws (Northern Ireland) 2008 (S.R. 2008 No. 319)
 Milk and Milk Products (Pupils in Educational Establishments) Regulations (Northern Ireland) 2008 (S.R. 2008 No. 323)
 Further Education (Student Support) (Eligibility) Regulations (Northern Ireland) 2008 (S.R. 2008 No. 324)
 Police (Testing for Substance Misuse) Regulations (Northern Ireland) 2008 (S.R. 2008 No. 325)
 Fixed-term Employees (Prevention of Less Favourable Treatment) (Amendment) Regulations (Northern Ireland) 2008 (S.R. 2008 No. 326)
 Westlink (Busways) Regulations (Northern Ireland) 2008 (S.R. 2008 No. 328)
 Child Maintenance (2008 Act) (Commencement No. 2) Order (Northern Ireland) 2008 (S.R. 2008 No. 331)
 Public Health (Ships) Regulations (Northern Ireland) 2008 (S.R. 2008 No. 333)
 Specified Animal Pathogens Order (Northern Ireland) 2008 (S.R. 2008 No. 336)
 Welfare Reform (2007 Act) (Commencement No. 6 and Transitional and Savings Provisions) Order (Northern Ireland) 2008 (S.R. 2008 No. 339)
 Zoonoses (Monitoring) Regulations (Northern Ireland) 2008 (S.R. 2008 No. 340)
 Road Traffic (Traffic Wardens) (Revocation) Order (Northern Ireland) 2008 (S.R. 2008 No. 341)
 Welfare Reform Act (Relevant Statutory Provision) Order (Northern Ireland) 2008 (S.R. 2008 No. 342)
 Social Security (Use of Information for Housing Benefit and Welfare Services Purposes) Regulations (Northern Ireland) 2008 (S.R. 2008 No. 343)
 Motor Vehicles (Speed Limits) (Amendment) Regulations (Northern Ireland) 2008 (S.R. 2008 No. 344)
 Establishments and Agencies (Fitness of Workers) Regulations (Northern Ireland) 2008 (S.R. 2008 No. 346)
 Health and Personal Social Services (Superannuation) (Additional Voluntary Contributions, Injury Benefits and Compensation for Premature Retirement) (Amendment) Regulations (Northern Ireland) 2008 (S.R. 2008 No. 350)
 Mesothelioma, etc., (2008 Act) (Commencement) Order (Northern Ireland) 2008 (S.R. 2008 No. 351)
 Pneumoconiosis, etc., (Workers’ Compensation) (Payment of Claims) (Amendment No. 2) Regulations (Northern Ireland) 2008 (S.R. 2008 No. 352)
 Mesothelioma Lump Sum Payments (Claims and Reconsiderations) Regulations (Northern Ireland) 2008 (S.R. 2008 No. 353)
 Mesothelioma Lump Sum Payments (Conditions and Amounts) Regulations (Northern Ireland) 2008 (S.R. 2008 No. 354)
 Social Security (Recovery of Benefits) (Lump Sum Payments) Regulations (Northern Ireland) 2008 (S.R. 2008 No. 355)
 Statutory Sick Pay (General) (Amendment) Regulations (Northern Ireland) 2008 (S.R. 2008 No. 356)
 Social Fund (Applications and Miscellaneous Provisions) Regulations (Northern Ireland) 2008 (S.R. 2008 No. 357)
 Zoonoses and Animal By-Products (Fees) Regulations (Northern Ireland) 2008 (S.R. 2008 No. 359)

External links
  Statutory Rules (NI) List
 Draft Statutory Rules (NI) List

2008
2008 in Northern Ireland
Northern Ireland Statutory Rules